Three College Observatory (TCO) is an astronomical observatory owned and operated by The University of North Carolina at Greensboro (UNCG), North Carolina Agricultural and Technical State University (N.C. A&T), and Guilford College (GC). The observatory, designed by W. Edward Jenkins, was funded with a $250,000 grant, however, it would cost $1.5 million to replace it today. The observatory's primary instrument is a  Ritchey-Chrétien reflecting telescope attached to an equatorial mount. It was built by Sigma Research and installed at TCO in 1981. TCO is used by UNCG for instruction and outreach. It continues to be the largest telescope in North Carolina and ones of the largest telescopes in the southeast.

See also
 Dark Sky Observatory
 List of astronomical observatories

References

External links 
 Department of Physics and Astronomy at UNCG
 Three College Observatory Clear Sky Chart Forecasts of observing conditions.

Astronomical observatories in North Carolina
Buildings and structures in Alamance County, North Carolina
University of North Carolina at Greensboro
North Carolina A&T State University
Guilford College